Now And Forever is the fourth studio album by Swedish heavy metal band Sister Sin. The album was mixed by Cameron Webb and released through Victory Records on October 23, 2012.

Track listing

Personnel 
Sister Sin
Liv Jagrell - Vocals 
Jimmy Hiltula - Guitar, Backing Vocals
Strandh - Bass, Backing Vocals
Dave Sundberg - Drums
Additional personnel
 Sara "Biggan" Biglert - Vocal Co-Production
Browntone Orchestra - Strings
Keno Holm - Assistant Engineer
 Urban Nasvall - Drum Tech

References 

2012 albums
Sister Sin albums
Victory Records albums